The Manor of Sezim is an 18th-century crested-manor home in the civil parish of Nespereira, in the municipality of Guimarães, located four kilometres southwest of Guimarães. Although currently known for its famous white wines, it is historically tided to the foundations of the Portuguese kingdom, showing characteristics common to the 15th and, latter, 18th centuries. This includes its complex and valuable wallpapers by Zuber & Cie, depicting imagery linked to the Portuguese Empire, European history and America.

History
It was in 1376 that the residence first entered into the possession of the familial descendants. It is recorded that D. Maria Mendes Serrazinha gave the property to Afonso Martins, a descendant of D. João Freitas (a friend of Afonso Henriques) for his "good works". This was first identified in vellum documents, now permanently held in the house's archive.

It was the same Master of Sezim, Afonso Martins, who later referred to the residence, when he identified that the grounds included "half of the residence tiled, cut granite, a threshing floor and vineyards" in 1390. A comparable document in 1396 identified the wine of Sezim.

In 1451, Afonso Vasques Peixoto, Abbey of Arões, instituted the Majorat of Quinta de Sezim (Estate of Sezim).

It is likely that in the 17th century the residence was reconstructed: the coat-of-arms over the entrance gate was replaced in 1795. At the end of the 18th century, the final arrangement and construction of the Residence of Sezim (the current layout and appearance) was completed by José Alexandre de Freitas do Amaral Castelo Branco. This landowner died in 1813.

Between 1830 and 1850, Castelo Branco's son (Manuel) was responsible for the remodelling and partial interior decoration of the residence. This included the installation of panoramic wallpapers with "Views of America"; scenes of the Indian sub-continent, designed by P. A. Mongin, from the "O Cenário Oriental" by Daniel, produced in 1806; and scenes from Don Quixote, the Battle of Austerlitz and the Greek War of Independence (1825), created (in 1834) by J. Zuber of Rixheim in Alsace. From a letter that exists in the family archive, the wallpaper came from Paris and was painted by Auguste Roquemont.

By the female line of succession, the residence came to pass to the Melo Sampaio family, then to the descendants of Pinto Mesquita. After his term as diplomat, the later owners began to reside permanently in Sezim, resulting in improvements to the property, a return of the vineyards and raising of English Friesian milking cattle. In fact, Sezim came to the foreground of initiatives to introduce commercial white wine production into the region.

On 3 November 1978, in a dispatch, the President of the IPPC Instituto Português do Património Cultural (Portuguese Institute for Cultural Patrimony) opened the process to classify the residence. The property-owner initiated public works to benefit the estate's adaption as a tourist residence in 1979.

Between 1989 and 1990, there were drastic improvements to the building, as it was being adapted: new roofing was applied to the dependencies, plastering of interior walls and painting of exterior walls was completed, while the southern facade was transformed for tourist use, along with new construction and road identification. Following a confirmation of the classification process (on 23 December 1996), the final approval came from the Ministry of Culture on 31 January 2003 (approximately twenty years after being initiated).

Architecture
The manor is located in the countryside, isolated and encircled by cultivated fields, orchards and gardens. Access to the principal gate is made through a large avenue encircled by oaks and Indian chestnuts.

The plan follows a "U" shape, consisting of three symmetric bodies enclosed by a principal wall facade acting as armored gate. The granite buildings extend horizontally and are covered by differentiated roof tiling. The wall that proceeds the residence is covered partially by graded-windows topped by a cornice and urn, that flank the main gate, itself topped by an ornate cornice and a highly embellished ovular coat-of-arms. Integrated into this facade symmetrically are the bodies of the residence and chapel, which is on the left facade of the entrance (distinguishable by iron cross surmounting the structure and belfry).

Beyond this wall is the main residence, consisting of long symmetrical bodies in three wings: the lateral spaces consisting of two floors with tower blocks linked by a central wing of only one floor. The central wing opens to the courtyard by small rectangular doors with small, simple windows on the facade. The principal entrances are made laterally from the tower blocks, proceeded by small staircases. The rear facade, oriented to the south, is divided into two floors: the first are the service areas covered in ivy, while the second-floor spaces are covered by a long porch and veranda, separated by thin, iron columns (demonstrating its colonial roots).

Interior
The interior of the residence is composed of a series of rooms, linked longitudinally, and decorated by wallpaper designs painted by French and Spanish artists. Among those painted are scenes from the "Views of America", "Indistan", "Dom Quixote", "Battle of Austerlitz", and the Greek War of Independence".

Chapel
The chapel comprises a single nave and rectangular presbytery aligned to the similarly rectangular sacristy (to its left). The principal facade is decorated with three pilasters, two with defined corners while the middle one divided into two registers, with cornice, fronted by a countercurved Latin cross over decorative figures. In the centre of this arrangement is a belfry composed of a Roman arch, flanked by pinnacles. The main rectangular door is surmounted by an ovular oculus, while on another register are circular oculi flanked by two clocks in stone. Along the southern facade of the chapel is the garden, organized in formal beds boxwood and lower terraces, distinguished by arched pergolas surrounded by pear trees.

The interior of the chapel consists of stucco-painted marbling, choir with connecting doors to the sacristy and the inner courtyard, wooden pulpit resting on corbel. The rounded, carved triumphal arch valance separates the chancel (also separated by wood grade) from the altar consisting of polychromatic carvings.

References
Notes

Sources
 
 
 
 
 
 
 
 
 
 
 
 

Sezim